Abdul Rasheed Na'Allah, (born 1962) is a Nigerian academic, he was vice chancellor of Kwara State University in Nigeria for 10 years, from 2009 to 2019 when he was appointed Vice chancellor of University of Abuja. He was appointed vice chancellor on 1 July 2019.

Biography
He received a BA in 1988 from University of Ilorin, with a thesis "Dadakuada: the trends in the development of Ilorin traditional oral poetry", subsequently published in  African Notes., and in 1992 received a M.A. Literature in English from the same university. In 1999, he received his PhD in Comparative Literature from the University of Alberta, Edmonton, Canada, and was subsequently professor and chair of African-American Studies at Western Illinois University. He then became the vice chancellor of Kwara State University in Nigeria, and now Vice Chancellor and Chief Executive of University of Abuja, in the Nigerian Capital City.

He is the author and co-author of numerous books, but some books of his that are most recent are Yoruba Oral Tradition in Islamic Nigeria: A History of Dadakuada (Routledge, 2019),	Globalization, Oral Performance, and African Traditional Poetry (Palgrave Macmillan, March 2018), African Discourse in Islam, Oral Traditions, and Performance (Routledge, 2010) and Africanity, Islamicity, and Performativity: Identity in the House of Ilorin (Bayreuth African Studies, 2009), and edited a poetry book, Obama-Mentum: An Anthology of Transformational Poetry.. Dr. Abdul-Rasheed Na'Allah's other books, include: coauthor with Ladan Sulaiman and Ahmad Sambo, Functional Literacy Primer in Hausa, sponsored by the European Economic Commission and Federal Government of Nigeria, 1992; coauthor, Instructors' Guide to Functional Literacy Primer in Hausa, 1992; coauthor with Bayo Ogunjimi, Introduction to African Oral
Literature (Oral Prose), University of Ilorin Press, 1991; author, Introduction to African Oral Literature (1994);
and Editor, Ogoni's Agonies: Ken Saro-Wiwa and the Crisis in Nigeria (Africa World Press, 1998)

Dr. Na'Allah has been nominated for and received numerous awards, including the 2018, Exemplary Leadership in Higher Education in Africa Award, by GUNi-Africa, 2017's Hero and Icon of Good Leadership award, by National Association of Nigerian Students (NANS), Joint Campus Committee, Kwara State; in 2016, African Patriot Award, by Commonwealth Youth Council; 2015, Inducted into the Member, WASU Hall of Fame, as Kwame Nrumah Leadership Award, by West African Students Union, WASU; also awarded Fellow, of the Literary Society of Nigeria, in March, 2014; also in 2014, given Meritorious Award as Notable Academician, by Rotaract Zone JD9125, Nigeria Rotary International; in 2013, decorated with the Leading Light Award, by the University of Ilorin Alumni Association, National; awarded in November 2013, the Award of Recognition of Sterling Achievements/Outstanding Contributions, by the Unilorin Alumni Association, Abuja Chapter; in 2012, given the Meritorious Award, by the Ilorin Emirate Students Union; also in 2012, decorated with the Honorary Membership and Merit Award, by the Man ‘O’ War Nigeria; in 2009, he received the Cathy O’Neill Couza Award for Outstanding Leadership in Diversity, Western Illinois University (WIU), USA; also in 2009, he was awarded the WIU’s Administrative Achievement Award 2008-2009 for achievements as Department Chair by Western Illinois University, USA; also in 2008, he was presented both Western Illinois University Certificate of Recognition, and Inducted into The Honor Society of Phi Kappa Phi Membership, USA;  he received the Gold Key Recognition Award, University of Alberta Student Union, in 1998; the Graduate Student Service Award, GSA, University of
Alberta; The Alberta Heritage Charles S Noble Award for Student Leadership, in 1998 by the Province of Alberta,
Canada; and the Black Achievements Award, Post-Secondary—Scholastic, 1998, by the Black Achievement
Awards Society of Alberta.

He wrote the article on Kwame Anthony Appiah for The Oxford Encyclopedia of African Thought  He was the immediate past Vice-Chancellor, Kwara State University (2015-2019) and is now the Vice-Chancellor, University of Abuja (July 2019-)

Publications

Books
Naʼallah, Abdul Rasheed. Cultural Globalization and Plurality: Africa and the New World. Trenton, NJ: Africa World Press, 2011.
Naʼallah, Abdul Rasheed. African Discourse in Islam, Oral Traditions, and Performance. New York: Routledge, 2010. 
Review, by Robert Cancel in African Studies Review, v50 n1 (Apr., 2007): 211-213
Review, by Beverly B. Mack in Research in African Literatures, 42, no. 1 (2011): 185
Bayo Ogunjimi; Abdul Rasheed Naʼallah Introduction to African oral literature and performance  Trenton, NJ: Africa World Press, 2005.
Review, by Robert Cancel, in African studies review. 50, no. 1, (2007): 211
Naʼallah, Abdul Rasheed. Ahmadu fulani: an African poetry. Trenton, NJ: Africa World Press, 2004.
Naʼallah, Abdul Rasheed, and Niyi Osundare. The People's Poet: Emerging Perspectives on Niyi Osundare. Trenton, NJ: Africa World Press, 2003.
Review, by Fidelis Odun Balogun Research in African Literatures, 35, no. 4 (2004): 186-188 
Naʼallah, Abdul Rasheed. Almajiri: a new African poetry. Trenton, NJ: Africa World Press, 2001.
Naʼallah, Abdul Rasheed. Ogoni's Agonies: Ken Saro-Wiwa and the Crisis in Nigeria. Trenton, NJ: Africa World Press, 1998.

References

External links
Africa Society profile at University of Alberta

1962 births
Living people
Nigerian academic administrators
Kwara State
Nigerian writers
Western Illinois University faculty
University of Ilorin alumni
Academic staff of Kwara State University
University of Alberta alumni